Prior to its uniform adoption of proportional representation in 1999, the United Kingdom used first-past-the-post for the European elections in England, Scotland and Wales. The European Parliament constituencies used under that system were smaller than the later regional constituencies and only had one Member of the European Parliament each.

The constituency of Cheshire West was one of them.

From 1979 to 1984, it consisted of the Westminster Parliament constituencies of Bebington and Ellesmere Port, Birkenhead, City of Chester, Nantwich, Northwich, Wallasey, and Wirral.  From 1984 to 1994, it consisted of Birkenhead, City of Chester, Eddisbury, Ellesmere Port and Neston, Halton, Wallasey, Wirral South, and Wirral West.

MEPs

Election results

References

External links
 David Boothroyd's United Kingdom Election Results 

European Parliament constituencies in England (1979–1999)
Politics of Cheshire
1979 establishments in England
1994 disestablishments in England
Constituencies established in 1979
Constituencies disestablished in 1994